Next Star is a Romanian reality competition television series broadcast on the Romanian television station Antena 1. It debuted in 2013. The focus of the series was to discover singing talent in those aged 3 to 13 years. The top prize is 20,000 euros. The series is presented by Dan Negru, and contestants are assessed by a jury of professionals. Famous performers from Romania and elsewhere occasionally take part to co-sing with the children.

The show was launched in 2013 and the first winner was Omar Arnaout, a Romanian of 
mixed Lebanese-Romanian origin. In later seasons, children from other countries were qualified to participate to become the "Next Star International". Besides solo participants, bands consisting of groups of children were also allowed to participate in competition.

The jury
The original jury was composed of Pepe, CRBL, Alina Eremia and Dorian Popa. For 5 seasons the jury was composed of Pepe, Connect-R, Maria Cârneci, Lora and Vasile Muraru. In the ninth season, the jury changed to be composed of Pepe, Lidia Buble and Dorian Popa.

Winners
Omar Arnaout (season 1: 2013); Runner-up: Teodora Sava
Vanessa Marzavan (season 2: 2013)
Rose Marie Lanciu (season 3: 2014)
Isabela Pampărau (season 4: 2014)
Emily Moskailenco (season 5: 2015)
Andrea Tucaliuc  (season 6: 2016)
Yasmina Butilă (season 7: 2016)
Katia Carbune (season 8: 2017)
Mihai Dobre (season 9: 2018)
Școala"Recea"(Season 10:2021)

References

External links
Official website
YouTube channel

Music competitions in Romania
Singing talent shows
Television series about children
Television series about teenagers